Summit Hills is a range of hills in Hidalgo County, New Mexico.

References

Hills of New Mexico
Landforms of Hidalgo County, New Mexico